Idol 2014 will be the Swedish Idol series' tenth season, which will likely premiere in August 2014 and end in December 2014. After the completion of season 9, TV4 announced a tenth season, Idol 2014, airing in 2014. The season will, in addition to the competition, also celebrate the show's 10th anniversary. Alexander Bard, Laila Bagge and Anders Bagge will return as judges from last season. The season's host is the same as 2011 and 2013, Pär Lernström.

Contestant who made the Top 24 Tristan Björling died in November 2014.

The finalists became Lisa Ajax and Mollie Lindén. and Lisa Ajax won.

Elimination Chart 
The diagram shows how each participant placed during the qualifying week and the weekly finals.

References

External links 
Official website

2010s Swedish television series
2014 Swedish television seasons
Season 10
2014 in Swedish music